Tynemouth Cricket Club, formed in 1847, play in the North East Premier League and have done so since their inception in 2000.

History 

Tynemouth cricket club has a fine history with a very strong youth system leading into the senior level 
with senior teams always in contention for division titles. The Club chairman remains long term Chairman Russell Perry.
The Current senior teams captains are:
First XI : B.Debnam 
second XI :G.Hallam
Saturday third XI: MULTIPLE 
Sunday Third XI :R.Perry
Midweek Third XI : L.Reed

Ground 
Tynemouth CC play at Preston Avenue, Tynemouth

Famous former players 
 Gordon Muchall, Durham and England
 Nicky Peng, Durham and England

English club cricket teams
1847 establishments in England
Cricket in Tyne and Wear
Tynemouth
Cricket clubs established in 1847